1993–94 Belarusian First League was the third season of 2nd level football championship in Belarus. It started in July 1993 and ended in June 1994.

Team changes from 1992–93 season
Winners of 1992–93 Belarusian First League (Shinnik Bobruisk) were promoted to Belarusian Premier League. They were replaced by two teams relegated from the Premier League (Obuvshchik Lida and Torpedo Zhodino).

Neman Stolbtsy and Stankostroitel Smorgon, who finished 15th and 16th respectively, relegated to the Second League. They were replaced by the winners of 1992–93 Second League (Brestbytkhim Brest).

Before the start of the season, Niva-Trudovye Rezervy Samokhvalovichi changed their name to Santanas Samokhvalovichi. Kolos-Stroitel Ustye relocated to Vitebsk and changed their name to Stroitel Vitebsk. Albertin Slonim were renamed to KPF Slonim before 3rd matchday in July.

Overview
Belarus Maryina Gorka were excluded from the league in October after 14 matchdays, after failing to show up for away match twice during the season. Their results were annulled and the club was excluded from the table.

Obuvshchik Lida won the tournament and returned to the Premier League after one season of absence. Smena Minsk, who finished last, relegated to the Second League.

Teams and locations

League table

Top goalscorers

See also
1993–94 Belarusian Premier League
1993–94 Belarusian Cup

External links
RSSSF

Belarusian First League seasons
2
2
Belarus